The Minister of Defence of Ukraine is the head of the Ministry of Defence, which is in charge of the Armed Forces of Ukraine, the second-largest military power in Europe after its Russian counterpart. The Minister of Defence is appointed by the President, but this has to be confirmed by a majority vote in the Verkhovna Rada (Ukraine's parliament). From 1 January 2019, Ukraine has had civilian control of the military by requiring that the Minister of Defence be a civilian, although they may have recently resigned from the military.

Since Ukrainian independence from the Soviet Union in 1991, there have been 17 defence ministers (not including acting ones).

List of Ministers of Defence

Ministers 

Since 4 November 2021 Oleksiy Reznikov is Minister of Defence.
The longest-serving Minister of Defence is Oleksandr Kuzmuk who served for a total of 2,063 days.The longest serving as an acting Minister of Defense is Valeriy Ivashchenko who served for a total 279 days (over 9 months).

First Deputy Ministers 
Created on 27 May 1992, the office of deputy ministers was expanded on 4 June 1992 with the chief of the General Staff holding the post until 8 February 2002. Since 10 September 2003, the post was "demilitarized", held only by civilian or retired military personnel. The first deputy serves as an acting minister in absence of officially appointed minister unless specified otherwise.

 27 May 1992 – 24 March 1993 Lieutenant General Ivan Bizhan (since 24 December 1991 a deputy minister; Chief of the General Staff since 25 September 1992)
 4 June 1992 – 25 September 1992 Lieutenant General Vasyl Sobkov (Chief of the General Staff)
 24 March 1993 – 10 February 1996 Colonel General Anatoliy Lopata (Chief of the General Staff)
 12 March 1996 – 30 September 1998 Lieutenant General Oleksandr Zatynaiko (Chief of the General Staff)
 14 March 1996 – 8 February 2002 Colonel General Ivan Bizhan
 30 September 1998 – 13 November 2001 Colonel General Volodymyr Shkidchenko (Chief of the General Staff)
 27 November 2001 – 8 February 2002 Colonel General Petro Shkulyak (Chief of the General Staff)
 In 2002 — 2003 all deputies were replaced (phased away) by newly created posts of state secretaries, but after the reform was reverted.
 25 January 2002 – 10 September 2003 Oleksandr Oliynyk
 5 February 2002 – 14 August 2003 Colonel General Viktor Bannykh (on issues of international cooperation) (died in office)
 10 September 2003 – ? November 2004 Oleksandr Oliynyk
 13 September 2003 – 7 October 2004 Valentyna Hoshovska (humanitarian policy and relations with parliament)
 5 October 2004 – 10 February 2005 Dmytro Rudkovskyi (governor of the office of Ministry of Defence)
 6 October 2004 – 25 February 2005 Oleksandr Stetsenko
 26 October 2004 – 25 February 2005 Volodymyr Bilyi (humanitarian policy and relations with parliament)
 19 February 2005 – 23 January 2008 Leonid Polyakov
 5 June 2009 – 26 May 2010 Valeriy Ivashchenko
 31 March 2010 – 2 June 2010 Hryhoriy Pedchenko
 18 August 2010 – 18 February 2012 Volodymyr Mozharovskyi
 18 February 2012 – 5 March 2014 Oleksandr Oliynyk
 15 September 2014 – present Ivan Rusnak

Earlier military ministers and secretaries 
Historically, the ministry was preceding by various other governmental institutions. The very first Ukrainian representative in military affairs was Symon Petlyura, appointed by Volodymyr Vynnychenko to General Secretariat of Ukraine in the summer of 1917. Later in December 1917 after establishing the Bolshevik government in Kharkiv the Military Secretary of Ukraine was opposed by the Military Secretary of Soviet Ukraine whom the first was Vasyl Shakhrai. Note that the first ministers of Ukraine were not specialists in military affairs, particularly such as Mykola Porsh.

The Ukrainian People's Army was in terrible condition and it was not until the power in the country was taken over by the former head of the Russian Imperial Retinue and hereditary Ukrainian Cossack Pavlo Skoropadsky, under leadership of which the new minister became Aleksandr Rogoza (also known as Oleksandr Rohoza). Rogoza was instrumental in restructuring the ministry and recruiting numerous former Russian Imperial generals who pledged their allegiance to the government of Ukraine. By the end of 1918 Bolsheviks recreated the Ukrainian Soviet government and to its office of military affairs was appointed Nikolai Podvoisky, former narkom of Military Affairs of Soviet Russia who played a key role in the October Revolution. Around that time there was created the government of the West Ukrainian People's Republic, the office of military affairs of which was headed by Dmytro Vitovsky who was a specialist in special operations, particularly the mountain warfare. Vitovsky played a key role in securing the city of Lviv and ensuring the proclamation of independence of the new Ukrainian state from the disintegrating Austro-Hungary.

National ministers

Ministers of Western Ukraine
 Dmytro Vitovsky
 Viktor Kurmanovych

Soviet appointees
 Vasyl Shakhrai
 Yuriy Kotsyubynsky
 Nikolai Podvoisky
 Valeriy Mezhlauk
 Vasyl Herasymenko

See also
Prime minister of Ukraine
Cabinet of Ministers of Ukraine

References

Defence
 
National Security and Defense Council of Ukraine